John Gude Wenman (11 August 1803 at Benenden, Kent – 25 November 1877 at Chobham, Surrey) was an English professional cricketer who played first-class cricket from 1825 to 1838.  He was a cousin of Ned Wenman.  He played for Kent and made nine known appearances in first-class matches.  He represented the Players in the Gentlemen v Players series and the South in the North v. South series.

References

1803 births
1877 deaths
English cricketers
English cricketers of 1787 to 1825
English cricketers of 1826 to 1863
Players cricketers
Kent cricketers
North v South cricketers
Left-Handed v Right-Handed cricketers
People from Benenden